Endotricha dyschroa is a species of snout moth in the genus Endotricha. It was described by Alfred Jefferis Turner in 1918, and is known from Norfolk Island.

References

Endotrichini
Moths described in 1918